Samuel Cáceres (born 20 March 1989) is a Paraguayan professional footballer who plays for Club Nacional as a centre back.

Career
Caceres began his career playing for the club  "Real Luján" in Argentina. In 2006, he traveled to Portugal to play for Benfica. But having no passport had he was forced to return to Argentina, and began playing for Atlético Independiente.

Caceres made his professional debut with Independiente in 2009 for the reserve team. Spending his entire career with Independiente and Nueva Chicago, Caceres is on loan to the New York Cosmos.

Teams
 Independiente 2009–2012
 Nueva Chicago 2012 and 2014
 Independiente 2012–2014
 New York Cosmos 2015–2016
 JDT II 2017

Titles
 Independiente 2010 Copa Sudamericana

External links
 
 New York Cosmos Profile
 

1993 births
Living people
Paraguayan footballers
Paraguayan expatriate footballers
Argentine Primera División players
Primera Nacional players
Primera B Metropolitana players
North American Soccer League players
Categoría Primera A players
Paraguayan Primera División players
Club Atlético Independiente footballers
Nueva Chicago footballers
New York Cosmos (2010) players
Deportivo Pasto footballers
Club Nacional footballers
Deportivo Capiatá players
Expatriate footballers in Argentina
Expatriate soccer players in the United States
Expatriate footballers in Malaysia
Expatriate footballers in Colombia
Paraguayan expatriate sportspeople in Argentina
Paraguayan expatriate sportspeople in the United States
Paraguayan expatriate sportspeople in Malaysia
Paraguayan expatriate sportspeople in Colombia
Sportspeople from Asunción
Association football defenders